Moderna Museet ("the Museum of Modern Art"), Stockholm, Sweden, is a state museum for modern and contemporary art located on the island of Skeppsholmen in central Stockholm, opened in 1958. In 2009, the museum opened a new branch in Malmö in the south of Sweden, Moderna Museet Malmö.

History 
The museum was opened in 9May 1958. In 2009, the museum opened a new branch in the building previously known as Rooseum in Malmö.

Directors 
 1958–1973: Pontus Hultén 
 1973–1977: Philip von Schantz
 1977–1979: Karin Lindegren
 1980–1989: Olle Granath
 1989–1995: Björn Springfeldt
 1996–2001: David Elliott
 2001–2010: Lars Nittve
 2010–2018: Daniel Birnbaum 
 2018–2019: Ann-Sofi Noring (acting)
 2019–present: Gitte Ørskou

Collection 
The museum houses Swedish and international modern and contemporary art, including pieces by Pablo Picasso and Salvador Dalí and a model of the Tatlin's Tower. The museum's collection includes also key works by artists such as Marcel Duchamp, Louise Bourgeois, Niki de Saint Phalle, Henri Matisse and Robert Rauschenberg, as well as ongoing acquisitions by contemporary artists.

On 8November 1993, six works by Picasso and two by Georges Braque totaling more than £40m were stolen from the museum in a renowned coup where the burglars came in through the roof by night, copying the method from the 1955 French film Rififi (French: Du rififi chez les hommes). All six of the Picasso paintings and one of the Braque paintings have been recovered.

Visiting the permanent collection is free of charge, but some of the temporary exhibitions has entrance fees.

Pontus Hultén Collection 
In 2005, former museum director Pontus Hultén bequeathed over 700 works of art to Moderna Museet, along with his archive and library. A few works of the collection are on display with the museum's permanent collection; many others are exhibited in the purpose-built Pontus Hultén Study Gallery.

Sculpture park 
The museum has a sculpture park on the island with works by sculptors of diverse nationalities.
The Four Elements, Alexander Calder, 1961
Le Paradis fantastique, Jean Tinguely and Niki de Saint Phalle, 1966
Déjeuner sur l'herbe, Pablo Picasso and Carl Nesjar, 1962
Monumentalfigur, Christian Berg, 1927
Monument över den sista cigaretten, Erik Dietman, 1975
Lenin Monument April 13th 1917, Björn Lövin, 1977
Mannen på templet, Bjørn Nørgaard, 1980
Svart svensk granit, Ulrich Rückriem, 1981
Pavilion Sculpture II, Dan Graham, 1984
Louisa, Thomas M. Woodruff, 1987
Freedom and Belief (their own affair), Joseph Kosuth, 1998
No title, Per Kirkeby, 1999–2000
Instabil, Lars Englund, 2005
Närkontakt, Gustav Kraitz, 2008

Architecture 
The museum was initially housed in Exercishuset on Skeppsholmen.

In 1994–98, it was temporarily moved to another location, the Spårvägshallarna, in Stockholm while the new building on Skeppsholmen, designed by the Spanish architect Rafael Moneo, was built. The Pontus Hultén Study Gallery was designed by Renzo Piano.

it is joined to ArkDes, aka the Swedish Centre for Architecture and Design.

Activity 
The museum organizes and is a venue for temporary contemporary art exhibitions throughout the year. In 2005, the museum hosted the onedotzero festival bringing a new younger audience to the museum with screenings, installations, talks and live VJ audio-visual events.

See also
 List of museums in Stockholm

References

External links 

 – in Swedish and English

Art museums and galleries in Stockholm
Modern art museums
Modernist architecture in Sweden
Rafael Moneo buildings
Art museums established in 1958
1958 establishments in Sweden